Zawiszyce  is a village located in southwestern Poland, in the Opole Voivodeship, Głubczyce County and Gmina Głubczyce.

Location
The village is situated 6 km north of Głubczyce.

Gallery 

Villages in Głubczyce County